Charles James Riddell is a New Zealand rugby league player who represented New Zealand in the 1957 World Cup.

Playing career
Riddell played in the Auckland Rugby League competition and first represented Auckland in 1953 against the American All Stars side. He was first selected for the 1955 series against France and toured Great Britain and France later that year. He also toured Australia in 1956 and was part of the 1957 World Cup squad. He played in nine test matches for the Kiwis between 1955 and 1957.

In 1960 Riddell was part of the Auckland side that defeated France 14–5 at Carlaw Park.

References

Living people
New Zealand rugby league players
New Zealand national rugby league team players
Auckland rugby league team players
Rugby league second-rows
Rugby league locks
Richmond Bulldogs players
Year of birth missing (living people)